Julius Kiesner was an American tire vulcanizer from Milwaukee who served five terms (1919–1928) as a Socialist member of the Wisconsin State Assembly representing Milwaukee's 9th Assembly district (the 9th and 10th wards).

He was born in Chilton, Wisconsin on Oct. 29, 1884 and was educated in the public schools of that city. He traveled extensively in the United States and Europe. In 1910, after moving to Milwaukee he joined the Socialist party.

In the Assembly 
He had never held public office until his successful 1918 bid for the Assembly to replace fellow Socialist Herman O. Kent. In his last race, in 1926, he ran unopposed (one of three Socialists to run unopposed in the 1926 election). He was succeeded by fellow Socialist Otto Kehrein.

After the Assembly 
In 1935 he was nominated as a possible "progressive" candidate for the City of Milwaukee election commission.

References 

1884 births
Members of the Wisconsin State Assembly
People from Chilton, Wisconsin
Politicians from Milwaukee
Tire industry people
Socialist Party of America politicians from Wisconsin
Year of death missing